The Ottoman–Safavid War (1578–1590) was one of the many wars between the neighboring arch rivals of Safavid Empire and the Ottoman Empire.

Starting with several years prior to the war and up to including most of the war itself, the Safavids were experiencing significant domestic issues and rivalling noble factions within the court since the death of Shah Tahmasp I. The Ottomans decided to declare war in 1577–1578 to exploit the chaos. The war, despite swift Ottoman victories in the first few years and large amounts of support from the Ottoman vassal Crimean Khanate during several stages of the war, eventually becoming geo-politically and military relatively stable for several years with both parties losing and winning smaller battles till around 1580. It eventually had a turning point following the Battle of Torches on 7–11 May 1583 and the assassination of the Safavid generals Mirza Salman Jaberi and Hamza Mirza. Following these turns of events and internal chaos in the Safavid state, the Ottomans headed towards the eventual victory in 1590.

Prelude
At the Sublime Porte, Grand Vizier Sokollu Mehmed Pasha was constantly urging against another war, but was overridden by the Sultan. The sultan however, pushed by the pro-war activists, decided to start the attack. Following Shah Tahmasp I's death, the central government in Qazvin had not been stable yet. The sultan saw it as a unique opportunity to conquer once again the territories that had been conquered by Suleiman the Magnificent over Safavid Iran decades earlier, but was not able to hold them for long. The sentiment for war was once again fueled by the fact that the Uzbeks had made an appeal to the Ottomans to make a combined attack from two fronts, as well as the Ottoman clergy that pushed the sultan to step us as the rightful defender of the Sunni's in the Safavid Empire. The latter pleaded that the sultan should seize the opportunity of Safavid weakness in order to bring a complete end to Shiism in Persia and its territories. When the Uzbeks started to attack the Safavids' far eastern territories comprising Khorasan, the Ottomans started the attack, effectively starting the war.

War
The Ottomans started the war, with the objective of conquering Azerbaijan and the Caucasus. They invaded the Safavids' Caucasian territories through Ardahan, taking Akhaltsikhe in August 1576, Tiflis in August 1578, and Kars and Tabriz in 1585, while pressing Kartli to become a tributary vassal of the Ottoman Empire.

The Safavids, who were left unable to conduct effective campaigns on both the eastern and western fronts, were met with repeated setbacks that forced them back into Iran's heartlands. The seizure of much of the Caucasus had now given the Ottomans a direct land route from the east with their allied Crimean Khanate.

Shirvan fell before the end of the summer of 1578, by which fact the Ottomans had now control of almost all territories west of the Caspian Sea coast, and it also opened the way for an attack on what is nowadays the core of Armenia and Azerbaijan, which were subsequently attacked in 1579 by a large contingent of Crimean Tatars, led by Adil Giray, but he was captured in a remarkable counterattack led by Mirza Salman Jaberi and Hamza Mirza, and later executed in Qazvin, the Safavid capital at that time. In the meanwhile, on the far eastern Safavid front, the Uzbeks were forced to retreat due to problems with the Kirghiz-Kazakh tribes of Central Asia. As a result of this, the Georgian princes which had fallen under Ottoman rule several years before, now changed their allegiance back to Safavid Iran, which they demonstrated by killing large numbers of Sunnis.

Nevertheless, the war headed for an Ottoman victory, which was becoming clearer and clearer following the Battle of Torches. With that victory, the Ottomans had consolidated control as far as the Caspian, including the Safavid possessions of Dagestan and Azerbaijan until the end of the war.
The reverses that the Safavids suffered on the battlefield also intensified several internal factional power struggles, in which Mirza Salman and Hamza Mirza were assassinated by assassins of the other faction within the court, with Hamza Mirza, son of Mohammad Khodabanda, being assassinated on 10 December 1587. With their deaths, the war efforts of the Safavids deteriorated even more.

In 1585, an Ottoman force under Osman Pasha had managed to take Tabriz, which would remain under Ottoman rule for the next two decades. In 1587, Ottoman forces under the Governor of Baghdad, Cığalazade Yusuf Sinan Pasha, managed to take Luristan and Hamadan. That same year, the Uzbeks had concluded their own problems back in Central Asia, and had started to attack the Safavids' eastern provinces once again. It appeared that the very existence of the Safavid state was now in question. In 1588, the Ottoman commander Farhād Pasha advanced into Karabakh through Georgia. Many of the Turkic Qizilbash tribes, which formed the backbone of the Safavid military, submitted without any significant resistance in order to protect their own interests.

In the face of all these difficulties -and even a staged coup in Qazvin by Murshi Quli Khan, of the Ustalju Qizilbash clan- Mohammad Khodabanda decided to abdicate, favouring the throne to his son Shah Abbas I (who would be later be known as Abbas the Great). At the time he took over, all Iranian provinces in the Caucasus, Mesopotamia, Anatolia, and even in western Iran were occupied by the Ottomans, while the Uzbeks had seized swaths of its eastern territories. Therefore, in order to settle matters at home first and to defeat the Uzbeks, he decided to sign a humiliating peace treaty on 21 March 1590, by which the war ended.

Summary of the main battles
The main battles and events of the war included:
 Lala Mustafa Pasha's Caucasian campaign
 Battle of Çıldır (9 August 1578)
 Battle of Torches (9–11 May 1583)

Aftermath
A peace of Istanbul was concluded on 21 March 1590, in which Iran was forced to confirm these Ottoman conquests, as well as promising to end Shiite propaganda in Ottoman territories and persecution of Sunnis in its own lands. By ceding many of its integral regions to the Ottomans, Abbas could settle matters in his crumbling state first, which had been neglected for so long by his father Mohammad Khodabanda. After having the matters settled and the state and military significantly reorganised, Abbas would declare war again on the Ottomans in 1603, crushingly defeating them and reconquering all lost territories by the Treaty of Istanbul.

The advent of the Ottoman-Safavid war temporarily deflected Ottoman interest from European affairs, where the Ottoman Empire had been active with the Franco-Ottoman alliance and the support of the Dutch Revolt, in an interesting episode of mutually-supportive relations between Islam and Protestantism.

See also
 Ottoman–Safavid War (1603–1618)
 Crimean Khanate

Notes

Sources
 
 

Ottoman–Persian Wars
Ottoman period in Georgia (country)
16th-century conflicts
Military history of Georgia (country)
1580s in the Ottoman Empire
16th century in Iran
16th century in Georgia (country)
History of the Caucasus
History of Dagestan
Military operations involving the Crimean Khanate
Wars involving the Kingdom of Kartli
Wars involving Safavid Iran